Captain John may refer to:
 John Clifton Wright, Capt. John, best selling author of books on America's Great Loop
 John Cameron (chief) (1764-1828) a Chief of the Mississauga Nation, known for signing treaties with the Crown
 Captain John (Paiute), a Paiute leader at Mono Lake, California
 Captain John's Harbour Boat Restaurant, a prominent floating restaurant in Toronto for several decades